"Without Your Love" is a song released in 1980 by Roger Daltrey of The Who written by Billy Nicholls and was a hit for him on his album McVicar. The song was included in the soundtrack of the film McVicar, a bio-pic of English bank robber John McVicar, that was produced by Daltrey and also featured him in the starring role. The original version of the song was by Billy Nicholls himself with his band White Horse in 1977.

The single was produced by Jeff Wayne and recorded at Advision Studios, London with Daltrey's vocals recorded at Air Studios, Montserrat, West Indies.

Track listings
US release
"Without Your Love" (3:17)	
"Escape Part 1" (3:58) - B-side
Belgium & Spain releases
"Without Your Love"
"Say It Ain't So, Joe"

Netherlands release
"Without Your Love"		
"My Time Is Gonna Come"

Charts
"Without Your Love" was released as a single in the United States, and in various European countries in 1980 and peaked at No. 20 on the Billboard Hot 100. It was also a minor hit in the UK, reaching No. 55 in the UK Singles Chart, and was a big hit in the Netherlands reaching No. 2 there.

Weekly charts

Year-end charts

See also
Roger Daltrey discography

References

External links
 

1980 songs
1980 singles
1980s ballads
Polydor Records singles
Songs written for films
Songs written by Billy Nicholls
Song recordings produced by Jeff Wayne